The Thăng Long Bridge (Cầu Thăng Long, completed 1978) is a bridge in Hanoi, Vietnam, which connects the city with Noi Bai Airport.

References

 

Hong River
Bridges in Hanoi
Bridges completed in 1978